Holmestrand Station was a railway station on the Vestfold Line located in the town of Holmestrand in Vestfold, Norway.

The station was opened in 1881 with the opening of the railway line. In October 2016 the station was closed to prepare the opening of the new Holmestrand Station.

History

The station was built as a third-class station. The original floor plan consisted of a station master's office, three other offices, a ticket office, an express cargo expedition, a waiting room and a restaurant on the ground floor. The upper story consisted of a station master's apartment, with four rooms, a kitchen and a maid's room. The station complex further consisted of a cargo house, a water tower and two sheds, a smithy and warehouse for the track division. All the machines were run via a belts from a central engine. Water was supplied from a basin at the top of Holmestrandsfjellet.

The station was staffed by a station master, three telegraphists, three station workers, a cargo clerk and a foreman. The station originally had three tracks, later increased to four to handle a commuter train between Holmestrand and Drammen. In addition there was a spur for loading cargo. The station was at the time also connected via a branch to the port, which again connected to the Holmestrand–Vittingfoss Line.

Holmestrand Station originally had large cargo customers in Nordisk Aluminiumsindustry, later Høyang, and Holmestrand Dampsag. All of these accessed the station via HVB tracks. As production was reduced, so did the freight through the station. After Linjegods took over break bulk cargo, cargo handling at Holmestrand was terminated.

Facilities
Holmestrand Station is located just outside the town center, close to Holmestrand Bad.

Service

As well as serving Holmestrand, the station has become the primary choice for commuters in Horten who prefer this station to Skoppum Station. Although Skoppum is closer to Horten, the road access to Holmestrand is vastly superior.

Future
The track both north and south of Holmestrand are tortuous, with many curves and at places poor foundations making it prone to landslides. Due to this, trains cannot run at high speeds in the area. Plans are in the works to straighten most of this 16.7 km section of line by placing it in a tunnel, while implanting a double track at the same time.

In 2009, the Norwegian National Rail Administration recommended building a new station inside the mountain, just west of the current station. The proposed station will have four tracks, two of them with platforms, and two intended for passing trains. Building the track inside the mountain instead of around it will allow express trains to pass through at 250 km/h instead of 130 km/h.

References

External links

Jernbaneverket's entry on Holmestrand Station

Railway stations in Holmestrand
Railway stations on the Vestfold Line
Railway stations opened in 1881
1881 establishments in Norway